Friedrich Heer (10 April 191618 September 1983) was an Austrian historian born in Vienna.

Early life
Heer received a PhD at the University of Vienna in 1938. Even as a student, he came into conflict with pan-German historians as a staunch opponent of National Socialism.

He was arrested for the first time on 11 March 1938 by the Austrian Nazis. He founded a small Catholic resistance group and sought to amalgamate into one organised band the Christians, communists and trade unionists against the Nazis. As a soldier, he later came into contact with the resistance group "Soldatenrat".

Career
From 1946 to 1961, he was the editor of the weekly magazine Die Furche [The Furrow], and in 1961, he was appointed chief literacy to the Vienna Burgtheater. He taught at the University of Vienna. Most of his books have been translated into several languages. He contributed The Medieval World: 1100-1350 (pub. 1962) to the Weidenfeld and Nicolson History of Civilisation series.

Later life
In 1967, he became the first winner of the Martin Buber-Franz Rosenzweig Medal, awarded by a group of forty-four German societies for Christian and Jewish understanding, for his achievement with God's First Love.

He died in Vienna.

Decorations and awards
 1949: City of Vienna Prize for Humanities
 1968: Award of the German Coordinating Council of Societies for Christian-Jewish Cooperation first ever "Buber Rosenzweig Medal" (with the Protestant theologian Friedrich-Wilhelm Marquardt) (Presentation: March 17, 1968)
 1972: Grand Austrian State Prize (Presentation: 21 December 1972)
 1976: Medal of the capital Vienna in gold for important journalistic and academic achievements (council decision of 21 May 1976)
 1977: Austrian Cross of Honour for Science and Art, 1st class (awarded May 4, 1977)
 1981: Donauland Nonfiction Book Award

Publications
1947: Die Stunde des Christen
1949: Gespräch der Feinde
1949: Aufgang Europas (2 Bände)
1950: Der achte Tag (Roman, erschienen unter dem Pseudonym „Hermann Gohde“)
1952: Die Tragödie des Heiligen Reiches
1953: Europäische Geistesgeschichte
1953: Grundlagen der europäischen Demokratie der Neuzeit
1960: Die dritte Kraft
1961: Mittelalter – von 1100 bis 1350 (The Medieval World: 1100-1350, Weidenfeld & Nicolson, 1962)
1964: Europa – Mutter der Revolutionen (The Intellectual History of Europe, Weidenfeld & Nicolson, 1966)
1967: Das Heilige Römische Reich (The Holy Roman Empire, Weidenfeld & Nicolson, 1968). Abridged translation reprinted by Phoenix Press, 1995
1967: Gottes erste Liebe. Die Juden im Spannungsfeld der Geschichte.  (God's First Love: Christians and Jews Over Two Thousand Years, Weidenfeld & Nicolson, 1967). Reprinted by Phoenix Press, 1999
1968: Der Glaube des Adolf Hitler. Anatomie einer politischen Religiosität. 
1974-75: Kindlers Kulturgeschichte des Abendlandes
1975: Charlemagne and his World (Weidenfeld & Nicolson, 1975)
1978: Warum gibt es kein Geistesleben in Deutschland? 
1981: Der König und die Kaiserin (Gegenüberstellung Friedrich II. und Maria Theresia)
1981: Der Kampf um die österreichische Identität

References

External links
Official website

1916 births
1983 deaths
20th-century Austrian historians
Writers from Vienna
Academic staff of the University of Vienna
University of Vienna alumni
Recipients of the Grand Austrian State Prize
Recipients of the Austrian Cross of Honour for Science and Art, 1st class